Milly is a feminine given name, sometimes used as a short form (hypocorism) of Mildred, Amelia, Emily, etc. It may refer to:

People
 Milly Alcock (born 2000), Australian actress
 Milly Babalanda (born 1970), Ugandan politician
 Milly Bernard (1920–2005), American politician
 Milly Childers (1866–1922), English painter
 Milly Clark (born 1989), Australian long distance runner
 Milly Dowler (1988–2002), murdered English schoolgirl
 Milly Durrant (born 1985), Welsh former footballer
 Milly Johnson (born 1964), British romance novelist
 Milly Mathis (1901–1965), French actress, mainly in films, born Emilienne Pauline Tomasini
 Milly Quezada (born 1955), Latin American singer
 Milly Ristvedt (born 1942), Canadian abstract painter
 Milly Scott (born 1933), Dutch actress and singer born Marion Henriette Louise Molly in 1933
 Milly Shapiro (born 2002), American stage actress and singer
 Milly Vitale (1933–2006), Italian actress
 Milly Witkop (1877–1955), Ukrainian-born Jewish anarcho-syndicalist and feminist writer and activist
 Milly D'Abbraccio, an Italian porn actress who acts in the Milf genre
 Milly Zero (born 1999), English actress

Fictional characters
 Amelia "Milly" Michaelson, a character in 1986 American fantasy drama film The Boy Who Could Fly
 Milly, female lead character of the 1954 film Seven Brides for Seven Brothers and Seven Brides for Seven Brothers (musical)
 Milly Bloom, who does not actually appear in the James Joyce novel Ulysses other than through recollections and letters
 Milly Theale, a major character in the Henry James novel The Wings of the Dove
 Milly, a Fireside Girl from the Disney animated television series Phineas and Ferb

Other
 Milly (dog), the world's smallest dog by height

See also
 Millie

Feminine given names
Hypocorisms